Erika Szuh (born 21 February 1990) is a Hungarian footballer who plays as a midfielder for the German club Türkiyemspor Berlin and the Hungary national team. She previously represented Lokomotive Leipzig, FC Lübars of Germany's Frauen-Bundesliga and the Swiss club FC Neunkirch.

In 2010 she went from Hungary to Germany, signing for Lokomotive Leipzig whose women section folded in 2013. Szuh then went to Berlin, signing for 1. FC Lübars. In summer 2015 Szuh was transferred to FC Neunkirch of the Swiss Nationalliga A. She returned after one year, before switching to Blau-Weiß Hohen Neuendorf. In 2018 she signed with Türkiyemspor Berlin, then playing in the fourth tier Berlin-Liga. She won promotion with her club in 2020 to the Regionalliga. In March 2022 she started coaching her team as a player-coach.

References

External links
 

1990 births
Living people
Hungarian women's footballers
Viktória FC-Szombathely players
Expatriate women's footballers in Germany
Hungarian expatriate sportspeople in Germany
People from Celldömölk
Women's association football midfielders
Hungarian expatriate sportspeople in Switzerland
Expatriate women's footballers in Switzerland
1. FC Lokomotive Leipzig players
1. FC Lübars players
FC Neunkirch players
Türkiyemspor Berlin players
Hungary women's international footballers
Frauen-Bundesliga players
Sportspeople from Vas County